John Simonett may refer to:
 John E. Simonett, attorney and Minnesota Supreme Court judge
 John Richard Simonett, politician in Ontario, Canada